Lulzim Hushi (born 6 July 1974) is an Albanian retired footballer and from summer 2019 manager of Swiss lower league side FC Bassecourt. He was a member of the Albania National Team in 2002. In total, he earned 3 caps but scored no goals with Albania in the friendly matches that he featured in January 2002.

Playing career

Club
His former teams are Besa Kavajë, Tirana in Albania, and SR Delémont in Switzerland, where he spent most of his career.

International
He made his debut for Albania in a January 2002 Bahrain Tournament match against Macedonia and earned a total of 3 caps, scoring no goals. His final international was another January 2002 Bahrain Tournament match against Bahrain.

National team statistics

Managerial career
Hushi returned as head coach of FC Moutier in November 2016, after being in charge of Delémont between May 2015 and September 2016. In April 2019, it was announced Hushi would be taking charge of FC Bassecourt for the 2019/20 season.

References 

1974 births
Living people
Footballers from Kavajë
Albanian footballers
Association football defenders
Albania international footballers
Besa Kavajë players
KF Tirana players
SR Delémont players
Albanian expatriate footballers
Expatriate footballers in Switzerland
Albanian expatriate sportspeople in Switzerland
Albanian football managers
SR Delémont managers
Albanian expatriate football managers
Expatriate football managers in Switzerland